Elizabeth Browne may refer to:
Elizabeth Somerset, Countess of Worcester (died 1565) (–1565), alleged mistress of Henry VIII
Elizabeth FitzGerald, Countess of Lincoln (1527–1590), married name Elizabeth Browne, sister-in-law of the above, wife of Sir Anthony Browne

See also
Elizabeth Brown (disambiguation)